Family Matters (Danish:Det bli'r i familien) is a 1993 Danish-Swedish-Portuguese drama film directed by Susanne Bier. The film stars Philip Zandén, Ghita Nørby, Ernst-Hugo Järegård, and Ana Padrao.

Plot 
On her deathbed Jan's mother tells him that he is adopted and that his biological mother is called Lilli. Jan seeks Lilli, who turns out to be an eccentric actress, and together they taxi to Portugal to find Jim's biological father. The mother and son get to know each other's good and bad sides, and on arrival in the south, Jan finds both the love of his life and his sister.

Cast 
 Philip Zandén as Jan
 Ghita Nørby as Jan's mother
 Ernst-Hugo Järegård as Håkon Borelius (as Ernst-Hugo)
 Ana Padrão as Constanca
 Anna Wing as The Grandmother
 Bodil Udsen as Ingrid
  as Frederico
  as The Taxidriver
 Charlotte Sieling as Nurse
  as Elisabeth
 Ann Christine Simonsen as Eva (as Ann Kristine Simonsen)
  as Bedemand
 Helene Egelund as Lena
 Isabel de Castro as Abbedisse
 Laurinda Ferreira as Hotel Receptionist

Themes 
Family Matters continued exploration of complex, tabooed family relations begun in Freud's Leaving Home, including an incestuous relationship between brother and sister.

References

External links 
 
 
 

1993 films
1993 drama films
1990s Danish-language films
1990s Portuguese-language films
1990s Swedish-language films
Danish drama films
Swedish drama films
Films directed by Susanne Bier
Films shot in Denmark
Films shot in Portugal
Films shot in Sweden
Nordisk Film films
1993 multilingual films
Danish multilingual films
Swedish multilingual films
Films produced by Peter Aalbæk Jensen
1990s Swedish films